June 16 - Eastern Orthodox Church calendar - June 18

All fixed commemorations below celebrated on June 30 by Orthodox Churches on the Old Calendar.

For June 17th, Orthodox Churches on the Old Calendar commemorate the Saints listed on June 4.

Saints
 Martyr Djan Darada (Aetius the Eunuch), the Ethiopian eunuch of Queen Candace, baptized by the Apostle Philip (1st century)  (see also: January 4, August 27)
 Hieromartyr Isaurus, deacon, and with him Martyrs Basil, Innocent, Felix, Hermias and Peregrinus, of Athens and Appolonia in Macedonia (284)  (see also: July 6)
 Hieromartyr Philoneides, Bishop of Kourion in Cyprus (c. 306)  (see also: August 30)
 Martyrs Manuel, Sabel, and Ismael of Persia, at Constantinople (363)
 Venerables Joseph and Pior (395), of Scetis, disciples of Saint Anthony the Great (4th century)
 Venerable Bessarion the Great, Wonderworker of Egypt (4th-5th century)  (see also: February 20)
 Venerable Hypatius, Abbot, of the monastery of the Rufinianes, Confessor (446)

Pre-Schism Western saints
 Saint Antidius (Antel, Antible, Tude), disciple and successor of St Froninus as Bishop of Besançon in France; put to death by the Vandals at the hamlet called Ruffey (c. 265)
 Saint Montanus, a soldier who was taken to the island of Ponza in Italy and martyred (c. 300)
 262 Martyrs of Rome, under Diocletian, buried on the old Via Salaria in Rome.
 Saint Avitus (Avy), Abbot of Micy near Orleans, Confessor (c. 530)
 Saint Himerius of Cremona, Bishop of Ameila in Umbria (c. 560)
 Venerable Herveus of Plouvien (Hervé), blind from childhood, he became Abbot of Plouvien, from where he moved with some of his monks to Lanhouarneau (c. 575)
 Saint Briavel, a hermit at St Briavels, now in Gloucestershire in England (6th century)
 Saint Gundulphus (Gondulph), a bishop in France who is said to have reposed in Bourges (6th century)
 Martyr Nectan of Hartland, in Devon, hermit (6th century)
 Saint Agrippinus, Bishop of Como in the north of Italy (615)
 Saint Botolph, Abbot and Confessor, of Ikanhoe, England (680), and his brother, Saint Adolph the Confessor, Bishop of Maastricht (7th century)
 Saint Molling (Mo Ling, Myllin, Molignus, Dairchilla), a monk at Glendalough, later Abbot of Aghacainid (Teghmolin, St Mullins), then Bishop of Ferns (697)
 Saint Rambold (Ramwod, Ramnold), a monk at St Maximinus in Trier in Germany, then Abbot of St Emmeram in Regensburg, centenarian (1001)

Post-Schism Orthodox saints
 Martyr Shalva of Akhaltsikhe, Georgia (1227)
 Saint Ananias the Iconographer, of Novgorod (1581)

New martyrs and confessors
 New Hieromartyr Averky Severovostokov, Priest (1918)
 New Hieromartyr Nicander (Prusak), Hieromonk, of Yaroslavl (1918)
 New Hiero-confessor Maximus (Popov), Hieromonk, of Ryabash (Bashkiria) (1934)
 Virgin-Martyr Pelagia Balakireva (1943)

Other commemorations
 Uncovering of the relics of the Alfanov Brothers of Novgorod (1562): 
 Sts. Nicetas, Cyril, Nicephorus, Clement, and Isaac, founders of the Sokolnitzki Monastery in 1389.
 Repose of Elder Gervasius (Paraskevopoulos) of Patras (1964)

Icon gallery

Notes

References

Sources
 June 17/30. Orthodox Calendar (PRAVOSLAVIE.RU).
 June 30 / June 17. HOLY TRINITY RUSSIAN ORTHODOX CHURCH (A parish of the Patriarchate of Moscow).
 June 17. OCA - The Lives of the Saints.
 The Autonomous Orthodox Metropolia of Western Europe and the Americas (ROCOR). St. Hilarion Calendar of Saints for the year of our Lord 2004. St. Hilarion Press (Austin, TX). pp. 44–45.
 The Seventeenth Day of the Month of June. Orthodoxy in China.
 June 17. Latin Saints of the Orthodox Patriarchate of Rome.
 The Roman Martyrology. Transl. by the Archbishop of Baltimore. Last Edition, According to the Copy Printed at Rome in 1914. Revised Edition, with the Imprimatur of His Eminence Cardinal Gibbons. Baltimore: John Murphy Company, 1916. pp. 176–177.
 Rev. Richard Stanton. A Menology of England and Wales, or, Brief Memorials of the Ancient British and English Saints Arranged According to the Calendar, Together with the Martyrs of the 16th and 17th Centuries. London: Burns & Oates, 1892. pp. 271–273.
Greek Sources
 Great Synaxaristes:  17 ΙΟΥΝΙΟΥ. ΜΕΓΑΣ ΣΥΝΑΞΑΡΙΣΤΗΣ.
  Συναξαριστής. 17 Ιουνίου. ECCLESIA.GR. (H ΕΚΚΛΗΣΙΑ ΤΗΣ ΕΛΛΑΔΟΣ). 
  17 Ιουνίου. Αποστολική Διακονία της Εκκλησίας της Ελλάδος (Apostoliki Diakonia of the Church of Greece).
  17/06/2018. Ορθόδοξος Συναξαριστής. 
Russian Sources
  30 июня (17 июня). Православная Энциклопедия под редакцией Патриарха Московского и всея Руси Кирилла (электронная версия). (Orthodox Encyclopedia - Pravenc.ru).
  17 июня по старому стилю / 30 июня по новому стилю. Русская Православная Церковь - Православный церковный календарь на 2017 год.
  17 июня (ст.ст.) 30 июня 2014 (нов. ст.). Русская Православная Церковь Отдел внешних церковных связей. (DECR).

June in the Eastern Orthodox calendar